Pareutetrapha magnifica is a species of beetle in the family Cerambycidae. It was described by Schwarzer in 1925, originally under the genus Saperda. It is known from Taiwan and Japan.

Subspecies
 Pareutetrapha magnifica magnifica (Schwarzer, 1925)
 Pareutetrapha magnifica caeruleithoracica Takakuwa, 1984

References

Saperdini
Beetles described in 1925